Apisit Aonrak (born March 16, 1976) is a Thai former football referee who has been a full international referee for FIFA.

He was also a 4th official at the 2010 AFC Champions League.

He was preselected as a 4th official for the 2010 AFF Suzuki Cup.

On November 21, 2010, Aonrak will be the referee for the Final match of the 2010 Toyota League Cup, Buriram PEA vs. Thai Port at the National Stadium in Bangkok.

On December 19, 2010, Aonrak will be the 4th official for the Semi-Final match of the 2010 AFF Suzuki Cup, Indonesia vs. Philippines at the Bung Karno Stadium in Central Jakarta.

He served as a referee for 2014 World Cup qualifying, officiating the opening-round match between Bangladesh and Lebanon.

References

External links 
 
 

1976 births
Living people
Apisit Aonrak
Apisit Aonrak